Wikiturfing is a portmanteau of astroturfing and Wikipedia, also called wikiwashing as a portmanteau of Wikipedia and whitewashing. The term refers to an unethical reputation management technique employing Wikipedia to shape opinion. It has been labeled as "unethical and abusive"; an exploitative practice of an "extractive sharing economy", and a disinformation technique.

According to Mayo Fuster Morell, a scholar of the sharing economy, 

Another scholar, in the context of protest in modern China, writes:

Legal scholar Jim Chen noted the irony of the term "wikiturfing" being itself deleted from Wikipedia in 2006, stating "If Wikipedia dumps this piece of wikiturfing, as appears likely from the Wikipedia community's discussion of this entry, the last redoubt of wikiturfing (the term, not the practice) will be Wikidumper.Org."

Investigative journalists have created a web application, WikiWash, to track potential wikiwashing activities.

Further reading

See also
Internet Water Army (China nonstate actor)
State-sponsored Internet propaganda

References

Sources

External links
WikiWash investigation tool, metronews.ca

Internet manipulation and propaganda
Wikipedia